Tomb of the River , also known as Paid in Blood is a 2021 South Korean noir action film directed by Yoon Young-bin, starring Jang Hyuk and Yu Oh-seong. It was released on 10 November 2021.

Plot
Chairman Oh, the leader of a crime gang, plans to construct the biggest resort in Gangneung, with Kim Gil-seok as his loyal underling. Things turn violent when a new upcoming gangster Lee Min-seok sets his sight on the Gangneung resort, and uses all sorts of deceitful means to acquire it.

Cast

Main
Yu Oh-seong as Kim Gil-seok, loyal underling of Chairman Oh
Jang Hyuk as Lee Min-seok, a ruthless gangster from Seoul
Park Sung-geun as Cho Bang-hyun, a detective who is also Gil-seok's long time friend
Oh Dae-hwan as Kim Hyung-geun, Gil-seok's right-hand man

Supporting
Lee Hyun-kyun as Lee Chong-seop
Shin Seung-hwan as Kang Jung-mo, Min-seok's assistant
Song Young-kyu as President Shin
Kim Jun-bae as Choi Mu Sang
Lee Chae-young as Namkoong Eun-seon, Min-seok's partner
Han Sun-hwa as Han Bo-ram
Kim Se-joon as Chairman Oh
Kim Tae-han
Jo Hyun-shik
Choi Ki-sub

Production 
Principal photography began on October 19, 2020, and filming wrapped up on December 6, 2020.

This marks a reunion between the lead actors Jang Hyuk and Yu Oh-seong after filming the series The Merchant: Gaekju 2015 together in 2015–2016.

References

External links
 
 
 
 

2021 action films
South Korean action films
2021 films